Group A of the 2012 Fed Cup Americas Zone Group I was one of two pools in the Americas zone of the 2012 Fed Cup. Five teams competed in a round robin competition, with the top team and the bottom two teams proceeding to their respective sections of the play-offs: the top teams played for advancement to the World Group II Play-offs, while the bottom teams faced potential relegation to Group II.

Canada vs. Peru

Argentina vs. Bahamas

Canada vs. Argentina

Peru vs. Bahamas

Canada vs. Bahamas

Argentina vs. Peru

See also 
 Fed Cup structure

References

External links 
 Fed Cup website

2012 Fed Cup Americas Zone